Veronica Chou (also known as Veronica Sylvia Wing Wai Au Chou, born in ,1984) is a Chinese-American business woman.

Early life
Veronica Chou was born in Hawaii, United States. Her father is Silas Chou. Chou grew up in Hong Kong. She attended high school at Choate Rosemary Hall in Connecticut and went on to study communications and business at the USC in California.

Career
Chou is the president of Iconix China Group and Novel Fashion Holdings, companies founded by her father. 

In 2019, she launched Everybody & Everyone, a fashion brand selling women's clothes in sizes from 00 to 24.

In November 2021, she quit as a trustee of Fashion for Relief, a charitable foundation by Naomi Campbell, amidst a financial probe by the regulatory commission.

Personal life
On November 16, 2012, Chou married Russian Evgeny Klyucharev with 1,500 guests in the Russian Palace at Wan Chai's Grand Hyatt Hotel.   They were born on the same day. They have homes in London and Beijing and are parents to twin boys.

In November 2017, during a three-day case at London's Blackfriars Crown Court, Chou and Klyucharev accused their chauffeur, Irfan Zayee, of stealing a £167,000 diamond ring. They later dropped the charges.

References

Living people
Hong Kong businesspeople
Chou family
1984 births
University of Southern California alumni